Distinguished Civilian Service Award refers to one of the following awards presented by the United States government:

Chairman of the Joint Chiefs of Staff Joint Distinguished Civilian Service Award
Decoration for Distinguished Civilian Service
Department of Defense Distinguished Civilian Service Award
Navy Distinguished Civilian Service Award
President's Award for Distinguished Federal Civilian Service

Civil awards and decorations of the United States